Aiza is a name of Basque origin but with an unclear etymology. This spelling is first attested in 1127 in Navarre, now in Spain. Other variations of the surname are Ariza, Aritza and Aiza.

People

As surname
King Íñigo Íñiguez (Basque, Eneko Enekones) called Arista in Spanish and Aiza or Aritza in Basque was the first king of Navarre, Spain.  The House of Aritza (Aiza) was the ruling house of the Basque Kingdom of Navarra from 824 AD to 905 AD.

References

Basque-language surnames